Mundamveli is a small town in Kochi, Kerala, India which is famous for its scenic beauty. This place is situated at a distance of 12 km from the Ernakulam Railway station and 42 km from the Nedumbassery International airport. Famous tourist places like Fort Kochi, Mattancherry, Kumbalangy etc. are within 10 km radius of this place. The Arabian Sea is situated at a distance of 0.5 km from here. The place is rich with Indian Navy Quarters and Back waters which adds a magical beauty to it.

For Indian defence this place is very important since it houses so many navy and coast guard officers. The majority of the population are Latin Catholic Christians. The major attraction of this place is the famous St Louis church (AD1868). And this is the third-oldest parish in Kochi after Edakochi, and Mattancherry. The biggest celebration of this church is related to the feast of St. Jacob which is  celebrated every year on 30 December(Hes is also known as "Santhyapunnyaalan" called by the people of Mundamveli, maanaasery and Soudi. Lakh of people come from different parts of India.

Monsignor Lawrence Puliyanath who has been proclaimed as the "Servant of god" was born 8 August 1898 and brought up in Mundamveli. He completed his primary education from St Louis High School, which is an old famous aided school in Mundamveli situated in the campus of St Louis Church. Cathedral procedures are on its way in order to proclaim him as the "Saint". 

Mundamveli is home to an English-medium school, The Santa Maria E.M. School, Kendriya Vidyalaya, St. Anne's public School, St.Philipinery Convent school, and The Fr. Augustino Viccini Special School for hearing-impaired students
Jishy Hospital, PMSC Bank, Home Stays, Textiles shops, Ice Cream Parlours, Cafeterias, St.Marys Bakery,shilpa bakery, Muscle Style Multi Gym, Computer Cafe, etc. are located nearby St. Louis Church.

Location

Sources 

 Places of Kerala by TG Nair

Suburbs of Kochi